The Barberton Greenstone Belt is situated on the eastern edge of Kaapvaal Craton in South Africa. It is known for its gold mineralisation and for its komatiites, an unusual type of ultramafic volcanic rock named after the Komati River that flows through the belt. Some of the oldest exposed rocks on Earth (greater than 3.6 Ga) are located in the Barberton Greenstone Belt of the Eswatini–Barberton areas and these contain some of the oldest traces of life on Earth, second only to the Isua Greenstone Belt of Western Greenland. The Makhonjwa Mountains make up 40% of the Baberton belt. It is named after the town Barberton, Mpumalanga.

History and description 

The Barberton Greenstone Belt consists of a sequence of mafic to ultramafic lavas and metasedimentary rocks emplaced and deposited between 3.5 and 3.2 Ga. The granitoid rocks were emplaced over a 500-million-year time span and can be divided into two suites: The tonalite-trondhjemite-granodiorite (TTG) suite (emplaced approximately 3.5–3.2 Ga), and the granite–monzogranite–syenite granite (GMS) suite (emplaced approximately 3.2–3.1 Ga). The GMS suite are found over large parts of the Kaapvaal Craton and their emplacement coincides with the first stabilisation of the central parts of the craton. "The GMS suite in the Barberton granite-greenstone terrane shows very different internal and external characteristics from the earlier TTG suite. Individual plutons may cover several thousand square kilometres and these composite granitoid bodies have traditionally been referred to as batholiths, alluding to their compositionally and texturally heterogeneous nature and enormous areal extent. For the most part, the plutons appear undeformed."

The Barberton area underwent two tectonic episodes of terrane accretion at about 3.5 and 3.2 Ga. Early stages of shield development are exposed in the Barberton Mountains where the continent formation first took place by magmatic accretion and tectonic amalgamation of small protocontinental blocks. Several small diachronous blocks (3.6–3.2 Ga) have been found in the area. Apparently each block represents a cycle of arc-related magmatism and sedimentation. The Hooggenoeg Formation of the Barberton Greenstone Belt is dated at 3.45 Ga. and evolved through magmatism. This crustal development phase was followed by a period of Mesoarchaean cratonic magmatism (3.1–3.0 Ga) and is marked by the formation of a large crescent-shaped, juvenile arc that was accreted onto the northern and western margins of the evolving Kaapvaal shield. Archaean greenstone belts are hypothesized to have been formed from passive margin oceanic crust that became part of an extensive subduction-undercut margin. The TTG intrusions are thought to have been formed by post-subduction magmatism when subduction was halted, perhaps by arrival of a micro-craton.

The 3.1 Ga Mpuluzi batholith in the Barberton granite–gneiss terrane is made up of granite sheets. The structurally higher parts are underlain by an anastomosing network of steeply dipping, variably deformed dikes and sheets. According to a study done by Westraat et al. (2005): "Multiple intrusive relationships and geochronological evidence suggests that granite sheeting and the assembly of the pluton occurred over a period of 3–13 million years. The spatial and temporal relationship between deformation and magma emplacement reflects episodes of incremental dilation related to deformation along the bounding shear zones and granite sheeting. The transition to the mainly subhorizontal granite sheets at higher structural levels of the tabular Mpuluzi batholith indicates the intrusion of the granites during subhorizontal regional shortening, where the reorientation of the minimum normal stress to vertical attitudes at the shallow levels of emplacement allowed for vertical dilation and subhorizontal emplacement of the granite sheets."

Possible impact event 
In April 2014, scientists reported finding evidence of the largest terrestrial meteor impact event to date near the Barberton Greenstone Belt. The crater from this event, if it still exists, has not yet been found.

Barberton Greenstone Belt TTG and GMS suites
The Barberton Mountain is a well preserved pre-3.0 Ga granite-greenstone terrane. The greenstone belt consists of a sequence of mafic to ultramafic lavas and metasedimentary rocks emplaced and deposited between 3.5 and 3.2 Ga. The granitoid rocks were emplaced over a 500 million year time span and can be divided into two suites. The TTG suite (emplaced approximately 3.5–3.2 Ga) contains tonalites, trondhjemites and granodiorites; and the GMS suite (emplaced approximately 3.2–3.1 Ga) includes granites, monzogranites and a small syenite–granite complex.

According to a study by Yearron et al. (2003): 
"The TTGs are typically low- to medium-K, metaluminous I-type granites, Their chondrite-normalised REE patterns show two trends. The majority of plutons are  LREE-enriched, HREE-depleted and with small or no Eu anomalies, whilst the Steynsdorp and Doornhoek plutons are relatively HREE-undepleted with significant Eu anomalies. Nd isotope analyses show that the 3.4 Ga TTGs have positive εNd values (0 to +3.7), indicative of depleted-mantle sources, similar to the oldest greenstone belt formations (the Onverwacht). In contrast, the 3.2 Ga TTGs have negative εNd, suggesting crustal or enriched-mantle input into the magmas.

Extensive granite plutons of a subsequent magmatic episode are associated with the intrusion of vast amounts of granodiorite-monzogranite-syenite GMS suites. The GMS rocks are medium- and high-K metaluminous I-typerocks. They display two dominant REE patterns. Medium-K GMS rocks (the Dalmeinand portions of Heerenveen) are LREE-enriched, HREE-depleted and have no Eu-anomalies, whereas, the high-K GMSs (Heerenveen, Mpuluzi and Boesmanskop) are relatively HREE-enriched with negative Eu anomalies. Positive and negative εNd values (−4.4 to +4.8) for the Boesmanskop Syenite suggests depleted-mantle and crystal signatures. The εNd and REE patterns, in particular, provide insights into the compositions of potential source rocks and restites for the TTG and GMS suites.

Since HREEs and Eu are readily accommodated in garnet and plagioclase, respectively, their depletion suggests the presence of these minerals in the restite. For the TTG suite, we therefore suggest a garnet-rich amphibolitic or eclogitic depleted-mantle source at a depth >40 km. This has been confirmed by experimental work constraining the stability of garnet in the trondhjemite compositions, and at magmatic temperatures, to a pressure of 15.24 ± 0.5 kbar corresponding to a depth of 54.9 ± 1.8 km. In contrast, the GMS suite most probably had a plagioclase-rich, garnet-poor source that may be a mixture of depleted-mantle and crustal materials.

The two episodes of terrane accretion at ~3.5 and 3.2 Ga correspond to ages of TTG magmatism. This compressional tectonic regime, and the partial melting of greenstone-type material, suggest that basaltic amphibolites of the greenstone sequences are the source materials for the TTG suites. The likely source rocks for the GMS suite are not easily deduced, but chemistry and εNd values of the Boesmanskop syenite suggest a hybrid mantle-crustal source. This type of hybrid source might also explain the features of the monzogranitic batholiths. Close associations between syenite and monzogranites are common, particularly in post-orogenic extensional/transtensional settings. Although extensional activity has not been documented in Barberton, ~3.1 Ga strike-slip activity has. A post-orogenic thinning of the crust might explain the production of large voluminous monzogranite batholiths and the passive nature of their intrusion dynamics."

Hooggenoeg Formation of the Barberton Greenstone Belt
Some controversy exists pertaining to the origin and emplacement of Archaean felsic suites. According to a dissertation by Louzada (2003): "The upper part of the Hooggenoeg Formation is characterized by ultramafic massive and pillow lavas, a trondhjemitic suite of silicified felsic intrusive and flow banded rocks, and sedimentary chert beds. Veins of felsic, chert and ultramafic material intrude the belt. The depositional environment is thought to be a shoaling shallow sea in which the Hooggenoeg Formation has been deposited in a west-block down, listric faulted, synsedimentary setting."

The Hooggenoeg Formation felsic rocks can be divided into two groups: an intrusive group of interlocking and shallow intrusive rocks, and a porphyritic group of rocks from the veins. Lavas from the upper part of the felsic unit are too altered to be assigned to one of these groups. The intrusive group is related to the tonalite-trondhjemite-granodiorite TTG-suite Stolzburg Pluton, which intruded along the southern margin of the Barberton Greenstone Belt. Melting of an amphibolite quartz eclogite has been suggested as a probable origin for these high-Al2O3 felsic magmas. Ultramafic rocks of the Hooggenoeg Formation were most likely not parental for the felsic rocks. Subduction processes may have played a role in the generation of the felsic rocks, but a tectonic setting for the ultramafic rocks remains uncertain. The felsic units of the Hooggenoeg Formation are very similar to those of the Panorama Formation of the Early Archaean Coppin Gap greenstone belt of Western Australia (See Yilgarn Craton). Similarities in geological setting, petrography, and geochemical (trace elements in particular) characteristics suggest a possible genetic relation between the two formations and support the theory that a combined continent Vaalbara existed ~3.45 Ga.

IUGS geological heritage site
In respect of the research carried out on this 'unique remnant of ancient Earth's crust', the 'Archaean Barberton Greenstone Belt' was included by the International Union of Geological Sciences (IUGS) in its assemblage of 100 'geological heritage sites' around the world in a listing published in October 2022. The organisation defines an 'IUGS Geological Heritage Site' as 'a key place with geological elements and/or processes of international scientific relevance, used as a reference, and/or with a substantial contribution to the development of geological sciences through history.' The outcrops of the Barberton Greenstone Belt had previously been inscribed on UNESCO's list of World Heritage Sites in 2008 as 'Barbeton Makhonjwa Mountains.

See also

 List of impact craters on Earth
 List of possible impact structures on Earth

Notes

References

Volcanism of South Africa
Greenstone belts
Archean volcanism
Archean Africa
First 100 IUGS Geological Heritage Sites